Deh-e Shoeyb-e Do (also Romanized as Deh-e Sho‘eyb-e Do; also known as Deh-e Sho‘eyb and Deh Sho‘eyb) is a village in Jorjafak Rural District, in the Central District of Zarand County, Kerman Province, Iran. At the 2006 census, its population was 34, in 12 families.

References 

Populated places in Zarand County